Oleksandr Didukh (born 12 February 1982) is a Ukrainian table tennis player. He competed for Ukraine at the 2012 Summer Olympics.

References

1982 births
Living people
Ukrainian male table tennis players
Table tennis players at the 2012 Summer Olympics
Olympic table tennis players of Ukraine
Universiade medalists in table tennis
Universiade bronze medalists for Ukraine
Medalists at the 2009 Summer Universiade
Sportspeople from Rivne Oblast
21st-century Ukrainian people